Valerio Di Cesare (born 23 May 1983) is an Italian professional footballer who plays as a centre-back for  club Bari.

Career
Di Cesare moved his first footsteps into Lazio's youth system. During the summer of 2001, he accepted an offer from Chelsea, initially joining the Blues reserve team. However, he failed to break into the first team, and left England in January 2004 without making a single appearance, joining Avellino in temporary deal. Di Cesare was suffered him serious knee injury; before move to Avellino, he also went to Brentford and Como for a trial.

Di Cesare then went on to play in Serie B with AlbinoLeffe, Catanzaro and Mantova, joining the Virgiliani in January 2006.

Mantova
Di Cesare only played twice for the Veneto side in 2005–06 Serie B. In the next 2 seasons, out of possible 84 Serie B games, he played 46 times.

Vicenza
In June 2008, Di Cesare moved to Vicenza along with Simone Calori for €1 million and €500,000 respectively. However co-currently, Mantova had to sign Mattia Marchesetti and Riccardo Fissore also for €1 million and €500,000, thus made the deal a pure player swap without involvement of cash. All 4 players signed three-year contract. Di Cesare only briefly played again in the first season with his new club (13 times in Serie B); Di Cesare played 33 games in 2009–10 Serie B.

Torino
In his final year of the contract, Vicenza decided to sell him to Torino for €250,000 in three-year contract (€750,000 short with the original price or €83,333 with the residual value of the contract), while Calori who never played for the club was released for free with a write-down of €166,667.Torino FC SpA Report and Accounts on 31 December 2011  Di Cesare made 50 out of possible 84 Serie B appearances with the Toro, winning the promotion back to Serie A. Di Cesare played 9 times in 2012–13 Serie A. In June 2013, Di Cesare also obtained a license as youth team coach.

Brescia
On 8 August 2013, Di Cesare joined Serie B team Brescia. In 2015–16 Serie B, he did not receive a shirt number on 5 August. A week later he was sold to Bari.

Bari
Di Cesare signed a two-year contract with Bari on 12 August 2015.

Parma
On 31 January 2017, Di Cesare was signed by Parma in a -year contract.

Return to Bari
In September 2018, after being released by Parma, Di Cesare agreed to re-join Bari, following the club's refoundation in the Serie D league.

HonoursBari'
 Serie C: 2021–22 (Group C)

References

External links
La Gazzetta profile (2007–08 season) 
Lega Serie A profile 

1983 births
Living people
Footballers from Rome
Italian footballers
Association football central defenders
Serie A players
Serie B players
Serie C players
S.S. Lazio players
U.S. Avellino 1912 players
U.C. AlbinoLeffe players
U.S. Catanzaro 1929 players
Mantova 1911 players
L.R. Vicenza players
Torino F.C. players
Brescia Calcio players
S.S.C. Bari players
Parma Calcio 1913 players
Chelsea F.C. players
Expatriate footballers in England
Italian expatriate footballers
Italian expatriate sportspeople in England